Kiel Hauptbahnhof is the main railway station in the northern German city of Kiel. It consists of eight rail tracks, all of which are electrified, and is a hub for train services to nearby towns such as Plön and Eckernförde.

Overview
With 25,000 daily passengers and visitors to Kiel Hauptbahnhof, it is the second busiest railway station in Schleswig-Holstein after Lübeck Hauptbahnhof. The area around the station is the busiest place in Kiel. More than 100,000 people daily use the bus station, the railway station and the station forecourt.

The station is the starting point of lines to Hamburg, Lübeck, Flensburg and Husum. It is located directly on Kieler Förde. The ferry terminal for Oslo and Gothenburg is a few hundred metres away.

Kiel Hauptbahnhof is built as a railway terminus and has a three-aisled train shed, which is 121 metres long and 55 m wide.

History

Kiel's first railway station was built between 1843 and 1846 at Ziegelteich, about 500 m north of the current location. This station was unable to cope with the growing traffic, especially after the declaration of the Reichskriegshäfen ("Imperial War Harbours") in Kiel in 1871. The current location was selected for its improved access to the port by road. Construction began in 1895.

The western part of the six-track terminal station was completed and opened in 1899. Trains continued to run in the meantime to the old station through a gap in the east wing. After the opening of the new station, operations to the old station were abandoned and the east wing was completed in 1900. The old station was demolished in 1902. On the east side of the entrance building were the imperial steps (Kaisertreppe), which together with a curved driveway provided the shortest possible route to the harbour basin where the imperial yacht was berthed. The final completion of the west wing and the platform hall lasted until 1911 because, among other things, the city monastery and a poorhouse on Sophienblatt, had to be demolished.

In 1944, the station and the adjacent magnificent buildings were severely damaged by the Allies in a heavy air raid. Starting in 1950, the station was rebuilt in a simplified form. The restaurant was located in the eastern part of the entrance building, so that the imperial staircase was no longer available as an entrance. In the 1950s, the station environment was transformed. In particular, the access street of Sophienblatt was greatly broadened.

In preparation for the 1972 Summer Olympics, an elevated parking deck was built on the north side of the station forecourt, covering the central bus station, which was at ground level. The pedestrian connection between the railway station and the bus station across the forecourt at the time was effected by means of a pedestrian walk covered by a light steel structure, leading out of the main entrance arch of the railway station and ending at the raised parking level. In the station, a level for shopping was inserted in the station concourse and around the north entrance, which halved the historical ceiling heights. The parking deck and the central bus station underneath it was partly demolished from 2009 to 2010, reducing it by nearly a third at its southern end closest to the station. A hotel of the "Atlantic" chain was built there. It opened in June 2010 and cost around €23 million to build.

A pedestrian bridge that was built to connect the Sophienhof shopping centre, built in 1988, and the station building has affected the architecture of the building.

On the eastern side towards the harbour, the Erlebniszentrum (“experience centre”) CAP  was rebuilt in 1994/1995 with several restaurants and a large cinema. It has direct access at platform height from the easternmost platform. In 2010, the CAP had its second renovation, essentially involving changes in its passageway and entrance areas while retaining some local businesses, including a bowling alley and a discotheque.

The railway to Hamburg was electrified in 1995. Since then Intercity-Express trains start and end here daily.

In 1999, a comprehensive renovation of the station started. Among other things, it received a new lobby. The intermediate level of the historic hall was removed and thus the former ceiling height were restored. The pedestrian walkway to the bus station on the north side of the station was demolished without replacement and the pedestrian walkway to the Sophienhof shopping centre was replaced by a steel and glass structure. The redesigned station forecourt and the foyer with shops on the concourse were inaugurated for Kiel Week in June 2004. The imperial steps on the east side have been restored. Due to financial and technical difficulties, the reconstruction was interrupted several times and only concluded in May 2006 with the completion of a new station hall, only the cross-walk at the end of the platforms is still in its original condition although it has been refurbished. The total cost of the conversion amounted to €60 million. The cost for the work in the station hall was estimated to cost around €30 million. From 2013, there will be a further renovation of the station with the creation of tracks 2a and 6a. Track 2a was built outside the train shed with a connection to the platform for tracks 1 and 2. Tracks 6a is also built outside the train shed with a connection to the platform for tracks 5 and 6. These are needed to cope with the additional traffic on the Kiel-Rendsburg (-Fockbek) route and the Kiel–Schönberger Strand route from 2014.

Routes

Regular services to the station operate on the following lines:
 Kiel–Eckernförde–Flensburg 
 Kiel–Eutin–Lübeck
 Kiel–Rendsburg–Husum
 Kiel–Neumünster–Hamburg

Occasionally operated line

Kiel–Schönberg–Schönberger Strand railway; from 1897 to 1911 and from 1954 to 1981, the passenger trains of the Kiel–Schönberger railway terminated at the station. Especially on weekends in the summer months, special trains ran to Schoenberg beach; in some years there was even a fixed timetable. Since September 2013, daily school trains have  operated to the recently completed Kiel Schulen am Langsee station.

Closed and dismantled line 

The trains of the Kiel–Segeberg Light Railway had its terminus at the Hauptbahnhof from 1 July 1954, but services ended on this line in 1961.

Rail services

The station is served by the following services.

Long distance services

Regional services (as of 2015)

Notes

References

External links

 
 

Railway stations in Schleswig-Holstein
Hauptbahnhof
Hauptbahnhof
Railway stations in Germany opened in 1899